God's Not Dead may refer to:
 God's Not Dead (album), a 2011 album by the Newsboys
 Newsboys Live in Concert: God's Not Dead, a 2012 live album by the Newsboys
 "God's Not Dead (Like a Lion)", a song by the Newsboys
God's Not Dead, a series of Christian films:
God's Not Dead (film), a 2014 Christian film
God's Not Dead 2, a 2016 sequel
God's Not Dead: A Light in Darkness, a 2018 sequel
God's Not Dead: We The People, a 2021 sequel

See also
"Bart's Not Dead", an episode of The Simpsons referencing the Christian film series
God is dead (disambiguation)